Michael Donnellan (1900 – 27 September 1964) was an Irish Clann na Talmhan politician.

Donnellan was born in Dunmore, County Galway in 1900. He joined Sinn Féin after the Easter Rising in 1916. Donnellan served as a member of Galway County Council from 1927 until 1945, originally as a member of Fianna Fáil.

Donnellan became disenchanted with the party in the mid-1930s, as did many supporters in the province of Connacht. He became involved in talks with a number of farmers in order to create a new Farmers' Party. The original group was known as the Irish Farmers Federation, however, it split shortly afterwards between the larger more conservative farmers and poorer more radical farmers from the West over the issue of de-rating. Donnellan led the radical faction, which founded Clann na Talmhan in 1939. In 1940 a by-election was called in the Galway East constituency and his supporters persuaded him to stand. Fine Gael stood aside hoping to inflict damage on Fianna Fáil, which won, though Donnellan secured almost 30% of the votes cast.

At the first Ard-Chomhairle of Clann na Talmhan in March 1943, he stated that the party's reason for existing was to "break the stranglehold of the money-grubbers and Jews". According to historian RM Douglas, this was not the only act of anti-Semitism Donnellan committed as party leader.

He was elected to Dáil Éireann as a TD for Galway East at the 1943 general election and re-elected in 1944. Following constituency revision, he represented Galway North between 1948 and 1961 before being elected again for Galway East in the 1961 general election.

Donnellan, however, proved too radical for the party members from the province of Leinster, due to his more left-wing leanings: He supported land redistribution in cases where large farmer holders were being inefficient as well as free access to education and healthcare. He was soon replaced as party leader by conservative Mayoman Joseph Blowick. Donnellan's decision to abstain on Éamon de Valera's nomination for Taoiseach in 1943 led some to suspect he had done so out of loyalty to his old party leader. Donnellan served as a Parliamentary Secretary to the Minister for Finance on two occasions with responsibility for the Office of Public Works.

In his youth Donnellan was a talented footballer who won an All-Ireland SFC medal with the Galway county team in 1925, captaining them in their 1933 defeat to Cavan. He died at Croke Park during the 1964 All-Ireland Senior Football Championship Final, shortly before his sons John Donnellan, as victorious Galway captain and Pat Donnellan, received the Sam Maguire Cup. The subsequent by-election was won by John, standing as a Fine Gael candidate.

His grandson, also named Michael, won All-Ireland SFC medals with Galway in 1998 and 2001.

See also
Families in the Oireachtas

References

1900 births
1964 deaths
Michael
Fianna Fáil politicians
Clann na Talmhan TDs
Galway inter-county Gaelic footballers
Irish farmers
Irish sportsperson-politicians
Members of the 11th Dáil
Members of the 12th Dáil
Members of the 13th Dáil
Members of the 14th Dáil
Members of the 15th Dáil
Members of the 16th Dáil
Members of the 17th Dáil
Parliamentary Secretaries of the 13th Dáil
Parliamentary Secretaries of the 15th Dáil
Politicians from County Galway